Olympic Gold  is the official video game of the Games of the XXV Olympiad, hosted by Barcelona, Spain in 1992. It was released for the Sega consoles, Sega Genesis and Sega Master System, and Sega's handheld, Sega Game Gear.

Developed internally by Tiertex Design Studios, the game was sponsored by Coca-Cola and the game featured both the company logo on a zeppelin above the scoreboard, as well as the company jingle.

The game uses button mashing as the main part of gameplay, but in three events it isn't used (archery, diving) or is slow-paced (swimming).

Each computer athlete has a fictional name and nationality (choosing from UK, France, Germany, Italy, Spain, United States, Japan and the Unified Team, everyone with its own anthem snippet) and actual strengths and weaknesses: J. Balen, for instance, is a frequent 100 m and 110 m hurdles record breaker but only an average hammer thrower. Also, each computer-controlled player seems better in a particular event depending on his country: Germans usually take the top spots in archery, Italians on swimming, Russians on pole vault, Americans on sprinting and so on.

Events

100 m
Hammer throw
Archery
110 m hurdles
Pole vault
200 m freestyle swimming
3 m springboard diving

Competition
The game allows the player to practice, play mini-Olympics (where some events can be turned off) or full Olympics. There are three difficulty levels (club, national and Olympic) with noticeable differences from each other: computer-controlled athletes are actually capable of breaking world and Olympic records at the higher levels, while achieving only mediocre results on lower levels.

Scoring in the Olympic modes follow the results table by position, the gold medal giving 24 points, and then reducing one point for each competitor behind until the 12th and last receives 13 points. The game is easy for experienced players, except for the sprinting and hurdles events and the hammer, as the computer is able to break records quite easily in Olympic, and they also rely on a fair share or luck and random.

Diving, unlike more recent titles where the player simply has to "click-a-long" a predefined sequence of buttons actually gives the player to control their own jumps. This means that one could indicate a jump and make one completely different, resulting in 0.0 notes. However, with practice it's perfectly possible to reach marks above 9.0 even for jumps rated 3.5. The same happens with pole vault, as an experienced player is able to clear 6.35 m easily.

Playable nations
There is a total of 8 playable countries in the game. They are:

Development
The game was showcased at the Consumer Electronics Show in January 1992.

References

1992 video games
1992 Summer Olympics
Athletics video games
Master System games
Summer Olympic video games
Game Gear games
Sega Genesis games
Sega video games
Tiertex Design Studios games
U.S. Gold games
Video games set in 1992
Video games developed in the United Kingdom
Video games set in Spain